KGKY may refer to:

 Arlington Municipal Airport (Texas) (ICAO code KGKY)
 KGKY-LD, a defunct low-power television station (channel 26) formerly licensed to serve Joplin, Missouri, United States